Huddersfield Town's 1954–55 campaign saw Town make a brilliant start in their second season back in the 1st Division. However, a disappointing mid-season ended their chance of improving on their 3rd-place finish the previous season. They eventually finished down in 12th place with 41 points, 7 points behind second placed Wolverhampton Wanderers. This was also the last season in which the leading goalscorer in Division 1 came from the club, when Jimmy Glazzard scored 32 goals.

Squad at the start of the season

Review
After losing their first 3 matches, Town went on an impressive run of just 1 defeat in 12 matches, which included wins over Chelsea, Wolverhampton Wanderers and Portsmouth, the teams who would eventually be the top 3 at the end of the season. Other interesting results during the season were a 5–3 win over Arsenal at Highbury and a 6–4 defeat by Wolverhampton Wanderers at Molineux.

Jimmy Glazzard's 32 goals made him the top scorer in Division 1, but a depressing spell between mid-December and early April which saw Town fail to register a win in the league saw Town drop out of the top 5 of the table. However, Town's form in the FA Cup didn't reflect their league form, as they reached the 6th round for the first time since the 1938–39 season, before losing to Newcastle United in a replay at St James' Park. In the league they finished 12th with 41 points.

Squad at the end of the season

Results

Division One

FA Cup

Appearances and goals

1954-55
English football clubs 1954–55 season